Robert Samuel Bibby (18 April 1925 – 21 January 1994) was an Australian rules footballer who played with St Kilda in the Victorian Football League (VFL).

Notes

External links 

1925 births
1994 deaths
Australian rules footballers from Melbourne
St Kilda Football Club players
People from Moonee Ponds, Victoria